Arthur Marsden (28 October 1880 – 31 July 1916) was an English cricketer who played first-class cricket for Derbyshire in 1910.

Marsden was born in Buxton the son of William E. Marsden, a railway engine driver, and his wife Eliza,

Marsden made one appearance for Derbyshire, in the 1910 season, against Kent in a heavy defeat for the team. Marsden, a right-handed batsman, appeared as an opening batsman in the first innings of the match when he was out for a duck, and scored 6 in his second innings slightly lower down the order.

Marsden died in St. Pancras at the age of 35 from wounds he had suffered during World War I.

References

External links
Arthur Marsden at Cricket Archive 

1880 births
1916 deaths
People from Buxton
Cricketers from Derbyshire
English cricketers
Derbyshire cricketers
British military personnel killed in World War I